Jaime Lozano (born 10 May 1948) is a Mexican boxer. He competed in the men's light welterweight event at the 1968 Summer Olympics.

References

External links
 

1948 births
Living people
Mexican male boxers
Olympic boxers of Mexico
Boxers at the 1968 Summer Olympics
Boxers from Mexico City
Light-welterweight boxers